Irreligion in Guatemala is a minority of the population, as Christianity is the predominant faith in the country. Irreligion has grown in the country since the 1990s. Most Guatemalans are Christian as cultural influence, and politically the Church still have great relationship with government. According to World Values Survey, 3.6% do not believe in God. According to ARDA investigations, 15% is non-beliver or atheitstic.

Separation of Church and State
According to the Guatemala constitution all citizens have the right to practice or not practice the religion of their choice.

Demographics of atheism
Atheism is prevalent amongst the Ladino population.

References

 
Religious demographics
Guatemala